Milija Mrdak (born 26 October 1991) is a Serbian male volleyball player who plays for the Serbia national team.

References

External links
 Profile at FIVB.org 

1991 births
Living people
Sportspeople from Kraljevo
Serbian men's volleyball players
S.L. Benfica volleyball players
Bulgarian expatriates in Portugal